Simon of the Desert is a 1965 Mexican surrealist film directed by Luis Buñuel and starring Claudio Brook and Silvia Pinal. It is loosely based on the story of the ascetic 5th-century Syrian saint Simeon Stylites, who lived for 39 years on top of a pillar. The screenplay was co-written by Buñuel and his frequent collaborator Julio Alejandro.

Following Viridiana (1961) and The Exterminating Angel (1962), Simon of the Desert was the third, and last, of Buñuel's films to star Pinal and be produced by Gustavo Alatriste, Pinal's husband at the time. It was also the final film of Buñuel's Mexican period before he returned to Europe. Today, it is generally acclaimed by film critics, who consider it to be one of the director's most demonstrative works.

Plot
When the ascetic Simón has spent six years, six weeks, and six days on a small platform atop an approximately ten-foot-tall pillar in the middle of the desert, a crowd of monks and peasants gathers around him and invites him to move to a much taller pillar that has been erected by a wealthy family to thank him for healing one of them. Peasants call out for his help as he is led the short distance to the new pillar, and his aging mother approaches and says she wishes to be near him until her death. He allows her to stay, though he says he will not acknowledge her so she does not distract him from his prayers. The monks attempt to bestow holy orders on Simón, but he refuses, saying he is an unworthy sinner.

Once atop his new pillar, Simón leads the crowd below in the Lord's Prayer, but a woman interrupts to ask him to help her husband, whose hands were cut off for stealing. Simón prays and the man's hands reappear, but neither the man, nor anyone else, is very impressed by the miracle, and the peasants depart. The monks stay behind to pray with Simón, but leave after he chastises one of them for looking at a woman who walks by carrying a jug, leaving Simón and his mother alone in the desert.

Brother Matías, a young monk, delivers lettuce and water to Simón, interrupting his prayers. Simón becomes frustrated after Matías leaves, as he had managed to forget his body, but now he is hungry and thirsty and yearns to feel the earth and embrace his mother. Just then, The Devil, who was also the woman with the jug, appears to Simón dressed like a young girl from a future time. She tries to tempt him with her body and jabs him in the back, but he banishes her by appealing to Christ.

One day, while Simón is leading the gathered monks in a prayer about asceticism, Brother Trifón interrupts to say he has found cheese, bread, and wine in Simón's food sack. Simón refuses to defend himself, and Trifón swears he did not place the food in the bag, so the monks pray to the Holy Ghost to show them who is guilty. Trifón has a fit, during which he admits to planting the food and rants against Simón and the teachings of the Church, and Simón exorcises Satan from him. As the other monks are carrying Trifón back to the monastery, Simón tells them to send Matías away until he can grow a beard, as he is too young to be so near the temptations of the Devil.

When he has been atop the column for eight years, eight months, and eight days, Satan comes to Simón dressed as God. She flatters him, and he is initially fooled, but he sees through the ruse when she says she is saddened by his excessive sacrifices and tells him to come down and experience earthly pleasures if he wants to get close to God. He rejects her and she leaves, after which Simón decides that, as penance for mistaking the Devil for God, he will henceforth stand on one leg.

The monk who looked at the woman visits Simón for his forgiveness and blessing and to tell him that the Antichrist is approaching Rome with an army. He remarks that mankind will always be in conflict because of its ideas about ownership, and, when Simón cannot understand, says he fears Simón has become disconnected from and of little use to the outside world. Simon blesses the monk and he leaves.

A coffin slides across the desert toward Simón's pillar. Satan gets out and transports Simón to a crowded 1960s nightclub with a live instrumental rock band on stage. The pair are in modern dress and sitting at a table, and Simón, looking disinterested, asks Satan what dance the people are doing. She responds that the energetic dance is called "Radioactive Flesh". A man asks Satan to join him, and Simón gets up to return home, but Satan says he has to "stick it out till the end."

Cast

Development
In 1960, after a long-term exile in Mexico, Buñuel returned to his home country of Spain to direct Viridiana. That film scandalized the Vatican and the Spanish government, leading Buñuel to resume his exile. Back in Mexico, he directed The Exterminating Angel in 1962 and Simon of the Desert in 1965. All three films starred Silvia Pinal, featured elements critical of religion, and retained elements from Buñuel’s earlier surrealist period.

Production
The film was shot primarily in the Samalayuca Dune Fields of Chihuahua, while the final scene was shot at Estudios Churubusco. Silvia Pinal's real-life daughter Sylvia Pasquel was an uncredited extra in the nightclub sequence.

Whereas Buñuel later said the film was supposed to be feature-length, but he ran out of money, Pinal said of the production:
It is not true that Simon of the Desert was a medium-length film because of Gustavo Alatriste's economic troubles. It was a production problem. There were supposed to be three stories with different directors. Buñuel's was just one of them. Alatriste and I went to Europe to seek  Federico Fellini, who was delighted to film with Buñuel, but he suggested his wife Giulietta Masina as the star. We saw another director, Jules Dassin, who would also accept if he was able to work with Melina Mercouri, his wife. We said no to them, because the idea was that the three stories would be starred by me. So, because everyone wanted to direct their own wives, Alatriste wanted to direct his own part with his wife, with me. I said no, and that was the beginning of our separation. Alatriste could not understand, or at least he was very hurt, when I explained to him that he could not direct beside Buñuel.

At one point, Pinal suggested Vittorio de Sica and Orson Welles could direct the other segments of the proposed anthology film, but nothing came of this, although in some markets Simon of the Desert was distributed with Welles' The Immortal Story (1968).

Release
Simon of the Desert was screened at the 26th Venice International Film Festival on 27 August 1965, and it won both a FIPRESCI Prize and a Special Jury Prize at the festival. It was later shown in New York on 11 February 1969.

Reception
A contemporary review in the Monthly Film Bulletin said the short length of the film ensures "that Simon's isolation, shot by Figueora with marvellous ingenuity, never risks becoming tedious. On the other hand, Bunuel's creativity is in such fine form that one can't help regretting the loss of those unshot extra minutes" and concluded that the film "makes for a startling, charming and healthily wicked little anecdote, with easily more sense to its hard theology than one could find in a whole tribe of biblical epics".

Simon of the Desert has received much acclaim since its original release. On review aggregator website Rotten Tomatoes, it has a 100% approval rating based on reviews from 17 critics, with an average score of 8.5/10.

In popular culture
The video clip for the song "The Laws Have Changed" from The New Pornographers’ 2003 album Electric Version heavily references the conclusion of the film, with a Simón-like figure lured from his pillar to a nightclub where the song is being played.

References

Sources

External links

Simon of the Desert: Damned If You Do . . . an essay by Michael Wood at the Criterion Collection

1965 films
1965 comedy films
1960s avant-garde and experimental films
1960s Spanish-language films
Estudios Churubusco films
Films directed by Luis Buñuel
Mexican satirical films
Mexican comedy films
Religious satire films
Surrealist films
The Devil in film
1960s Mexican films